The 2018 Dublin Senior Football Championship was the 132nd edition of Dublin GAA's premier Gaelic football tournament for senior clubs in County Dublin, Ireland. 31 teams participate (16 in Senior 1 and 15 in Senior 2), with the winner of Senior 1 representing Dublin in the Leinster Senior Club Football Championship. The draw for the group stages of the championship were made on 21 March 2018.

No team was promoted from the 2017 I.F.C. due to the rule that no reserve side who wins the I.F.C. (in this case Na Fianna 'B') can be promoted to the S.F.C.

St. Vincent's were the defending champions having defeated Ballymun Kickhams in the previous year's final.

Team Changes
The following teams have changed division since the 2017 championship season.

To S.F.C.
Promoted from 2017 Dublin Intermediate Football Championship
 None - (no reserve side who wins the I.F.C. [in this case Na Fianna 'B] can be promoted to the S.F.C.)

From S.F.C.
Relegated to 2018 Dublin Intermediate Football Championship
 None - (no senior side is relegated once a reserve side wins the I.F.C.)

Withdrew from Dublin Championships
 U.C.D.

Format changes for 2018

In 2018 the Dublin S.F.C. moved away from the straight knock-out format used in previous years. The championship was split into two sections called the Senior 1 and Senior 2 Football Championships. Teams were graded as Senior 1 or 2 depending on their performances in the previous five Dublin S.F.C.s.

Senior 1 Football Championship
16 teams compete in 4 randomly drawn groups of 4. The top 2 teams in each group qualify for the S.1.F.C. Quarter-Finals, with the outright winner of the S.1.F.C. representing Dublin in the Leinster S.C.F.C. The bottom teams in each of the four groups contest the relegation play-offs with the losers of the relegation final being relegated to the 2019 S.2.F.C.

Senior 2 Football Championship
15 teams compete in 3 randomly drawn groups of 4 and 1 group of 3 (due to the withdrawal of U.C.D. from the Dublin Championships). The top 2 teams in each group qualify for the S.2.F.C. Quarter-Finals, with the outright winner of the S.2.F.C. winning promotion to the 2019 Dublin S.1.F.C. The bottom teams in each of the four groups contest the relegation play-offs with the losers of the relegation final being relegated to the 2019 I.F.C.

Intermediate Football Championship
All reserve sides who played in previous I.F.C.'s will now compete in a separate competition among themselves known as the "All-County Intermediate Football Championship" (A.C.I.F.C.). All 16 first-teams compete in a separate championship in 4 randomly drawn groups of 4. The top 2 teams in each group qualify for the I.F.C. Quarter-Finals, with the outright winner of the I.F.C. winning promotion to the 2019 Dublin S.2.F.C. The bottom teams in each of the four groups contest the relegation play-offs with the losers of the relegation final being relegated to the 2019 Junior Football 1 Championship.

Junior 1 Football Championship
All reserve sides who played in previous J.F.C.'s will now compete in a separate competition among themselves known as the "All-County Junior 1 Football Championship" (A.C.J.1.F.C.).  All 16 first-teams compete in a separate championship in 4 randomly drawn groups of 4. The top 2 teams in each group qualify for the J.1.F.C. Quarter-Finals, with the outright winner of the J.1.F.C. winning promotion to the 2019 Dublin I.F.C. The bottom teams in each of the forum groups contest the relegation play-offs with the losers of the relegation final being relegated to the 2019 J.2.F.C.

Senior 1 Football Championship

Group A

Round 1

Round 2

Round 3

Group B

Round 1

Round 2

Round 3

Group 3

Round 1

Round 2

Round 3

Group D

Round 1

Round 2

Round 3

Senior 1 Football Championship Knock-Out Stage

Last Eight

Quarter-finals
St. Jude's, St. Sylvester's, Kilmacud Crokes, St. Vincent's, Na Fianna, Castleknock, Ballymun and Ballyboden qualified for the last eight of the Dublin Senior Football Championship.

Semi-finals

Final

Senior 1 Football Championship Relegation Playoffs

Relegation Semi-Finals
The relegation semi finals were cancelled as Parnells conceded relegation to the Senior 2 Football Championship for 2019. Clontarf, St. Oliver Plunkett's Eoghan Ruadh and Lucan Sarsfields retained their Senior 1 status and will compete in the 2019 Senior 1 Football Championship.

Senior 2 Football Championship

Group A

Round 1

Round 2

Round 3

Group B

Round 1

Round 2

Round 3

Group C

Round 1

Round 2

Round 3

Group D

Round 1

Round 2

Round 3

Senior 2 Football Championship Knock-Out Stage

Last Eight

Quarter-finals

Semi-finals

Final

Senior 2 Football Championship Relegation Playoffs

Relegation Semi-Finals

Relegation Final

References

External links
Dublin GAA Fixtures & Results
Live Updates and Scores

Dublin Senior Football Championship
Dublin Senior Football Championship
Dublin SFC